Casos e Acasos is a series of Brazilian TV Globo Network, written by Daniel Adjafre and Marcius Melhem, the general direction of Carlos Milan core of Marcos Schechtman (until the 15th episode) and Jayme Monjardim (from the 16th episode). First aired as a special year-end on December 26, 2007, the program went live April 3, 2008 and no longer appears in the following year.

Cast

Episode pilot 
 Humberto Martins - Lauro
 Antônio Calloni - Ernesto
 Taís Araújo - Gabriela
 Ricardo Tozzi - Freitas
 Érika Evantini - Michele
 Thiago Fragoso - Felipe
 Danton Mello - Adriano
 Marcelo Valle - homem que se separa da mulher
 Fábio Araújo - Robson
 Bethito Tavares - Júnior
 Alexandre Nero - Marcos
 Paula Pereira - mulher que se separa do marido
 Clarice Derzié Luz - vendedora de alianças

Participação especial
 Francisco Cuoco - Feldman

1º episódio ("O Encontro, o Assédio e o Convite") 
 Marcos Palmeira - Renato
 Graziella Moretto - Suzana
 Hugo Carvana - Álvaro
 Dira Paes - Gisele
 Ingrid Guimarães - Camila
 Marcelo Várzea - Luiz Eduardo
 Fulvio Stefanini - Dr. Teixeira
 Danton Mello - Gustavo
 Fábio Nassar - Sérgio
 Aílton Graça - Denis
 Isabel Guéron - Tatiana
 Xuxa Lopes - Esposa de Teixeira
 Thatiana Pagung - Gracinha
 Clemente Viscaíno - Chefe de Suzana
 Augusto Madeira - Guto
 Cláudio Mendes - Cláudio
 Daniel Warren - Pereira

2º episódio ("O colar, o cachorro e o DVD") 
 Maurício Mattar - Diego
 Tania Khalill - Fabiana
 Cristiana Oliveira - Simone
 Fábio Araujo - Alexandre
 Christiana Kalache - Helena
 Francisco Cuoco - Dr. Edgar
 Betty Gofman - Daniela
 Clarice Derzié Luz - Carla
 Ernesto Piccolo - Milton

3º episódio ("O flagra, a demissão e a adoção") 
 Beth Goulart - Sandra
 Ernani Moraes - Leandro
 Marcelo Novaes - Paulo
 Guilhermina Guinle - Luiza
 Paulo Vilhena - Wilson
 Roberta Rodrigues - Emília
 Carla Regina - Carol
 Marcos Frota - Evandro
 Marcelo Valle - Tomás
 Henri Pagnoncelli - Orlando
 Edwin Luisi - Dr. Aristides
 Kacau Gomes - Márcia
 Marcelo Capobianco - Zé
 Wendell Bendelack - Ismael
 Anja Bittencourt - Celí
 Phil Miler - Ronaldo

4º episode ("O triângulo, a tia Raquel e o pedido") 
 Giovanna Antonelli - Jamile
 Ricardo Tozzi - Rodrigo
 Giselle Itié - Manuela
 Luigi Baricelli - Edgar
 Bia Seidl - Cristiana
 José Rubens Chachá - Vitor
 Luciana Braga - Denise
 Cláudio Mendes - Haroldo
 Malu Valle - Eliane
 Fernanda de Freitas - Joana
 Sérgio Marone - Pedro
 Antônio Pitanga - Médico
 Neuza Borges - Empregada de Denise
 Janaína Barbosa - Empresária
 Renan Ribeiro - Mateus
 Luisa Perissé - Nina
 João Vítor Silva - Lucas

5º episódio ("O ex, a promoção e o vizinho") 
 Henri Castelli - Marcelo
 Gabriela Duarte - Carol
 Eriberto Leão - Henrique
 Bruno Garcia - Carlos
 Mel Lisboa - Júlia
 Fúlvio Stefanini - Dr. Fontenelle
 Cláudia Provedel - Amanda
 Tato Gabus Mendes - Saulo
 João Miguel - Teles
 Priscila Sztejnman - Mônica

6º episódio ("O desejo escondido, o cara reprimido e o livro roubado") 
 Cissa Guimarães - Beth
 Kayky Brito - Tiago
 Vera Fischer - Vera
 Sérgio Hondjakoff - Rafael
 Luiz Carlos Vasconcelos - Gilberto Gomes
 Odilon Wagner - Lauro Diniz
 Milena Toscano - Catarina Savoy
 Angelita Feijó - Maria Helena
 Flávio Migliaccio - Olavo
 Thiago Fragoso - Cláudio
 Ana Lúcia Torre - Regina
 Danton Mello - Ulisses
 Maria Maya - Sílvia
 Celso Frateschi - Pai de Sílvia
 Rafael Primo - Valdir

7º episódio ("A prova, a namorada e a isca") 
 Cássia Kiss - Débora
 Paulo Betti - Mário
 Lidi Lisboa - Cléo
 Jairo Mattos - Celso
 Maria Flor - Fernanda
 Aílton Graça - Ricardo
 Carlo Briani - Péricles
 Totia Meireles - Catarina
 Thiago Amaral - André
 Márcia do Valle - Rose
 Manuela do Monte - Carol
 Beno Bider -

8º episódio ("A escolha, a operação e a outra") 
 Ney Latorraca - Walmor
 Joana Fomm - Eliete
 Samara Felippo - Sofia
 Alice Borges - Selma
 Roberta Rodrigues - Júlia
 Neuza Borges - Carmem
 Marcelo Médici - Téo
 Antônio Fragoso - Henrique
 Enrique Diaz - Fred
 Carolyna Aguiar - Dora
 Edmilson Barros - Jorge

9º episódio ("O trote, o filho e o fora") 
 Ricardo Tozzi - Renan
 Fernanda de Freitas - Maria Cecília
 Danton Mello - Wagner
 Thomas Veloso - Lucas
 Cris Couto - Maria Emília
 Eva Todor - Alba
 Tarcísio Filho - Marcondes
 André Arteche - Júnior
 Maurício Gonçalves - Toninho
 Mateus Solano - Gilson
 Guilherme Hundadze - Lucas

10º episódio ("O presente, a sociedade e a tentação") 
 Tato Gabus Mendes - Vicente
 Bianca Byington - Kika
 Leonardo Miggiorin - Maurício
 Grazi Massafera - Graziela
 Phellipe Haagensen - Jaime
 Luciele di Camargo - Soraya
 Emílio Orciollo Netto - Amadeu
 Bruce Gomlevsky - Ciro
 Vanessa Lóes - Lígia
 Joelson Medeiros - Matias
 Mariana Hein - Carla
 Rodrigo Penna - Odiado
 Paulo Vespúcio - Viciado

11º episode ("O concurso, o vestido e a paternidade") 
 Carla Diaz - Val
 Tatyane Goulart - Bel
 Babu Santana - Ozênio
 Luciana Rigueira - Valdirene
 Elias Gleizer - Aristides
 Marcelo Laham - Sílvio
 Pedro Neschling - Arthur
 Fúlvio Stefanini - Dr. Camilo
 Eduardo Martini - Belmiro
 Luciana Braga - Mother of Val
 Eliana Fonseca - Adriana
 Zé Vitor Castiel - Gilmar
 Rafael Ciani - Neto de Aristides
 Carlo Briani - Genro de Aristides
 Orã Figueiredo - Genro de Aristides
 Rosaly Papadopol - Filha de Aristides
 Ana Baird - Filha de Aristides

12º episódio ("A foto, a troca e o furto") 
 Isabela Garcia - Letícia
 Eriberto Leão - Erasmo
 Sérgio Marone - Wilson (Bombeiro Bombado)
 Betty Gofman - Mariana
 Alexandre Borges - Vinícius
 Fernanda Vasconcellos - Bianca
 Rodrigo Phavanello - Fábio Kiusa
 Marcelo Novaes - Reinaldo
 Pascoal da Conceição - Dr. Arruda
 Miele - Dono do Clube das Mulheres
 Ranieri Gonzalez - Lúcio
 Paulo José - Fulvio
 Paloma Riani - Bia
 Caio Lasmar - Tiago
 Pedro Lucas Lopes - Pedro
 Gláucio Gomes - Gláucio

13º episódio ("O colchão, a mala e a balada") 
 Vivianne Pasmanter - Suzana
 Tarcísio Filho - Marcos
 Bete Mendes - Hilda
 Marcos Caruso - Adauto
 Guilherme Berenguer - Marcelo
 Fernanda Paes Leme - Cristiane
 Mário Frias - Nelson
 Marco Antônio Gimenez - Jorge
 Duda Ribeiro - Tarcísio
 Rafael Zulu - Alex
 Alexandre da Costa - Segurança do Aeroporto
 Pedro Garcia Netto - Mota
 Paulo Miklos - Chefe de segurança do Aeroporto
 Nando Cunha - Rui
 Simone Soares - Hannah
 Henrique Taxman
 Ana Jansen
 Mariana Bassoul

14º episódio ("O carro, o e-mail e o rapper") 
 Carol Machado - Camila
 Rodrigo Lombardi - Inácio
 Joana Balaguer - Natasha
 Juliana Didone - Bianca
 Wagner Santisteban - Michel
 Créo Kellab - Lúcio / Tony Z
 Miguel Thiré - Adriano
 Tereza Seiblitz - Eduarda
 Augusto Madeira - Juca
 Marcos Frota - César
 Blota Filho - Augusto
 Murilo Grossi - perito
 Paulo Tiefenthaler - Freitas
 Marcelo Várzea - Vítor
 Flavia Rubim - Lara
 Clara Garcia - Chiara
 Marcos Baô - barman do restaurante
 Vinícius Manne - cliente do restaurante

15º episódio ("A nova namorada, o chefe e o dia fértil") 
 Leona Cavalli - Célia
 Ângelo Antônio - Rogério
 Rita Guedes - Carol
 Natália do Vale - Fernanda
 Tania Khalill - Iara
 Marcelo Médici - Gustavo
 Juan Alba - Otávio
 Fabíula Nascimento - Susy
 Francisco Cuoco - Anísio
 Ricardo Duque - Breno
 Flávio Migliaccio - Rangel
 Juliana Alves - Joelma
 Suely Franco - Mãe de Carol

16º episódio ("A blitz, o presente e os filhos") 
 Luigi Baricelli - Hugo
 Guilhermina Guinle - Regina
 Armando Babaioff - Gil
 Maria Fernanda - Luiza
 Bruno Lucas - Diego
 Monique Lafond - Anita
 Marcos Breda - Luiz
 Marcelo Valle - Rogério
 Paulo Goulart - Zenildo
 Fábio Araújo - Clóvis
 Narjara Turetta - Vilma
 Íris Bustamante - Selma
 Betty Erthal - Diva
 Kiko Mascarenhas - Josué
 Renata Tobelem - Beatriz

17º episódio ("O diagnóstico, o fetiche e a bebida") 
 Paulo Betti - Mauro
 Camila Morgado - Juliana
 André Gonçalves - Gerson
 Nívea Stelmann - Cíntia
 Herson Capri - Hugo
 Virgínia Cavendish - Luciana
 Alice Borges - Selma
 Lúcio Mauro - Dr. Rangel
 Luísa Thiré - Marilía
 Duda Mamberti - Dirceu
 Eva Todor - Paciente
 Gillray Coutinho - médico

18º episódio ("Quem é Amanda? Quem mandou o bombom? Quem passou a noite comigo?") 
 Letícia Spiller - Cléo
 Fernanda Rodrigues - Letícia
 Emílio Orciollo Netto - Edu
 Odilon Wagner - JP
 Giselle Itié - Lara
 Samara Felippo - Ana
 Sidney Sampaio - Luciano
 Cris Vianna - Marta
 Marcos Winter - Afonso
 Franciely Freduzeski - Amanda
 Bruno Padilha - Oliver
 Daniela Pessoa - Veronica
 Mariana Xavier - Susana
 Victor Frade - Stênio

19º episódio ("O beijo, a foto e o empréstimo") 
 Luís Melo - Linhares
 Rosane Gofman - Dona Marlene
 Ana Lima - Raquel
 Eri Johnson - Miguel
 Ícaro Silva - Luciano
 Nando Cunha - Jofre
 Paulo Gustavo Barros - Vitor
 Enrique Diaz - Caetano
 Pia Manfroni - Viviany
 Joelson Medeiros - Daniel
 Hugo Gross - Paolo
 Daniel Warren
 Márcio Vito
 Chico Terrah - Torquato
 Cláudio Torres Gonzaga - gerente do restaurante
 Anja Bittencourt - Sandra
 Ricardo Fogliatto
 Marcos Ferreira
 Tatih Köhler - aluna da universidade
 Ricardo Marrecos
 Aires Jorge
 Thiago Neri
 Dirce Migliaccio - avó de Raquel

20º episódio ("A noiva, o desempregado e o fiscal") 
 Priscila Fantin - Franciele
 Júlio Rocha - Uesley
 Henri Castelli - Marlon
 Marcelo Laham - Jorge
 Isabela Garcia - Cristina
 Mário Frias - Henrique
 Marcelo Várzea - Leandro
 Rodrigo Penna - Robertinho
 Alcemar Vieira - Jairo
 Cláudio Mendes - Edson
 John Herbert - padre
 Celso Frateschi
 Paulo Carvalho
 Cristina Prochaska - Regina
 Pietro Mário - tio de Franciele
 Otto Jr. - Norton
 Maria Regina - Marta
 Gabriel Kaufmann - Pedro

21º episódio ("A garota, o vestibular e os ingressos") 
 Sérgio Marone - Jéferson
 Bárbara Borges - Jaque
 Fúlvio Stefanini - Nestor
 Betty Erthal - Adelaide
 Wagner Santisteban - André
 Gregório Duvivier - Vitor
 Alamo Facó - Fábio
 Pedro Neschling - Alfredo
 Paulo César Grande - Maurício
 Marcos Breda - Gilberto
 Clarice Derzié Luz - Mara
 Adriano Garib - Antônio
 Cláudia Ventura - Matilde
 Kiko Mascarenhas
 Daiane Amêndola

22º episódio ("A vaga, a entrevista e o cachorro-quente") 
 Marília Pêra - Juíza Sônia
 Marcelo Médici - Roberto
 Júlia Lemmertz - Carla
 Paulo José - Àlvaro
 Flávio Bauraqui - Edvaldo
 Arieta Corrêa - Sara Lee
 Fafy Siqueira - Mônica Sá
 Renata Castro Barbosa - Rafaela
 Thaís Garayp - Solange
 Pascoal da Conceição - Túlio
 Ricardo Kosovski - Rodrigo
 Gilberto Miranda - João
 Cláudia Provedel - advogada

23º episódio ("O encontro, o homem ideal e a estréia confusa") 
 Fernanda Machado - Adriana
 Ingrid Guimarães - Nina
 Ernesto Piccolo - Artur
 Augusto Madeira - Edmundo
 Marcos Winter - Fábio Basrsovski
 Bianca Byington - Adélia
 Odilon Wagner - Lourenço
 Ricardo Blat - Oliveire
 Bruno Padilha - René
 Tatyane Goulart - Beth
 Roberto Lopes - garçom

24° episódio ("As testemunhas, o hóspede e os amantes") 
 Murilo Rosa - Cássio
 Juliana Knust - Júlia
 Emílio Orciollo Neto - Carlinhos
 Nando Cunha - Lauro
 Fabíula Nascimento - Lúcia
 Orã Figueiredo - Brito
 Lúcio Mauro - Geraldo
 Aracy Balabanian - Amélia
 Gillray Coutinho - Dr. Astolfo
 Thalita Carauta - Regina
 Ricardo Duque - Luiz

25º episódio ("A aliança, a queixa e a revista") 
 Tarcísio Filho - Wagner
 Gabriela Duarte - Vivianne
 Ithamar Lembo - Lúcio
 Pia Manfroni - Germana
 Inez Viana - Daniela
 Henrique Ramiro - Saulo
 César Cardadeiro - André
 Cássia Kiss - Marilene
 Marcos Breda - Ronaldo
 Isaac Bardavid - Pedro Paulo
 Gláucio Gomes - delegado
 Igor Paiva - Policial Silva
 Cristiana Pompeo - camareira
 Adriane Piovesani - Fátima

26º episódio ("O teste, o gato e o rejeitado") 
 Flávia Alessandra - Gilda
 Bárbara Borges - Débora
 Nelson Xavier - Armando
 Joelson Medeiros - Oscar
 Georgiana Góes - Monique
 Mayana Moura - Penélope
 Bia Montez - Judite
 Cláudia Ventura - Rejane
 Cláudio Galvan - Juvenal
 Saulo Arcoverde - Heitor
 Camila Caputti -

27º episódio ("A dominatrix, a venda e a babá") 
 Maria Luísa Mendonça - Olívia
 Eri Johnson - Fábio
 Cláudio Mendes - Samuel
 Giselle Itié - Cristina
 Edwin Luisi - Alencar
 Carol Machado - Marta
 Alexandre Zacchia - Bira
 Daniel Warren - Tiago
 Fernando Alves Pinto - Carlo
 Jorge Lucas - vizinho de Olívia
 Daniela Pessoa - Renata
 Sérgio Monte - Adílson

28º episódio ("A fuga arriscada, a nova namorada e o recheio do bolo") 
 Alinne Moraes - Giane
 Henri Castelli - Serginho
 Lui Mendes - Edu
 Sérgio Marone - Léo
 Débora Lamm - Cláudia
 Carlos Casagrande - Flávio
 Fiorella Mattheis - Mariana
 Celso Frateschi - Renato
 Luca de Castro - treinador do time de futebol
 Rodrigo Candelot - Nélson

29º episódio ("O ultimato, o vândalo e a pensão") 
 Marcos Frota - Alberto
 Cissa Guimarães - Marília
 Deborah Evelyn - Glória
 Fernanda Machado - Fabíola
 Guilherme Weber - Rodrigo
 Kiko Mascarenhas - Olavo
 Ricardo Duque - César
 Priscila Assum - Margô
 Rafael Miguel - Tiago
 Sylvia Massari - Solange
 Paulo César Grande
 Maurício Gonçalves
 João Camargo

30º episódio ("O celular, a viagem e o dia seguinte") 
 Marcelo Médici - Tomás
 André Ramiro - Bruno
 Monique Alfradique - Gabriela
 Suzana Pires - Regina
 Pedro Neschling - Ramon
 Marcelo Laham - Natan
 Domingos de Oliveira - Bartolomeu
 Sheron Menezes - Júlia
 Isaac Bardavid - Otacílio
 Lucélia Santos - Lucila
 Pitty Webo - Isadora
 Hilda Rebello - Mafalda
 Buza Ferraz - Jairo
 Thaís Garayp - Benedita

31º episódio ("Ele é ela, ela é ele e ela ou eu") 
 Murilo Rosa - Rubens
 Samara Felippo - Bianca
 Mônica Martelli - Valéria
 Dalton Vigh - Manoel
 Sílvia Pfeifer - Ana Paula Gueiros
 Gianne Albertoni - Milene Richter
 Carlo Porto - Ely
 Alexandre da Costa - Araújo
 Alice Borges - Marisa
 Jorge Lucas - Pedrão
 Paulo Gustavo Barros - John
 Ricca Barros
 Silvio Ferrari
 Alessandro Anes
 Mario Diegues

32º episódio ("O parto, o batom e o passaporte") 
 Guilherme Fontes - Chico
 Cristiana Oliveira - Bárbara
 Fúlvio Stefanini - Olavo
 Bruno Mazzeo - Jonas
 Daniele Valente - Sueli
 Mouhamed Harfouch - Leandro
 Bete Mendes
 Bia Montez - Norma
 Luiz Magnelli - Jorge
 Zéu Britto - Mário
 Lionel Fischer - médico
 Antônio Fragoso - Dirceu
 Anilza Leoni - mãe de Sueli

33º episódio ("A volta, a cena e as férias") 
 Eri Johnson - Pedro
 Maria Clara Gueiros - Marina
 Kiko Mascarenhas - Oscar
 Marcos Breda - Leandro
 Carolyna Aguiar - Vilma
 Thelmo Fernandes - Nereu
 Rita Guedes - Ivete
 Erik Marmo - Tico
 Augusto Madeira - Botelho
 Paulo Vespúcio - Miro
 Jairo Mattos - Lucas
 Thalita Carauta - Zefa
 Rui Rezende - Luiz
 Júlia Cruz - Duda
 Lucilia de Assis - Cida

34º episode ("A ciumenta, o ciumento e o ciúme") 
 Maurício Gonçalves - Rodrigo
 Guilhermina Guinle - Renata
 Guilherme Weber - Sérgio
 Isabela Garcia - Andréia
 Rodrigo López - Miro
 Regiane Alves - Aline
 Ângelo Antônio - Fábio
 Juliana Knust - Patrícia
 José Augusto Branco - Inácio
 Xandy Britto - Walter
 Tamara Taxman - professora de strip
 Henrique Taxman
 Isabela Lobato

35º episode ("A câmera escondida, o porta-"mala" e o chá de fralda") 
 Betty Lago - Magali
 Sheron Menezes - Rafaela
 Eriberto Leão - Cadu
 Sérgio Hondjakoff - Pedro
 Wagner Santisteban - Luciano
 Bruno de Luca - Heitor
 Joelson Medeiros - Luiz Carlos
 Vanessa Lóes - Regiane
 Babu Santana - Célio
 Ernesto Piccolo - Max
 Mary Sheyla - Vanda
 Nando Cunha - inspetor
 Duda Mamberti - Amaral
 William Vita - Dos Anjos
 Íris Bustamante - Carol
 Edgard Amorim - Luiz Henrique
 Oberdan Júnior - Toninho
 Fernando Ceylão - Souza
 Thaíssa Carvalho - Ana
 Clara Garcia
 Beth Raposo
 Vanessa Machado
 Cinara Leal
 Tatianna Trintex
 Patrícia Bacha

36º episódio ("O Papai Noel, a perna quebrada e o presépio") 
 Emílio Orciollo Neto - Enio Soriano
 Paola Oliveira - Verônica
 Bruno Mazzeo - Zé
 Carol Machado - Gabi
 Cláudio Mendes - Papai Noel Alessandro
 Bia Seidl - Paloma
 Giulio Lopes - Leonardo
 Carlos Vereza - Tio Jayme
 Betty Erthal - Maria Pia
 Hilda Rebello - Dona Isabela
 Ary França - Adriano
 Pia Manfroni - Vaquinha
 Flávio Bauraqui - Rei Mago
 Gillray Coutinho - Marcos
 Marcelo Laham - Avelino
 Cláudia Ventura - gerente da loja
 Joelson Gusson - segurança

References

External links

2007 Brazilian television series debuts
Brazilian anthology television series